Michael Grumley (July 6, 1942 – April 28, 1988) was an American writer and artist.

Grumley was born in Bettendorf, Iowa. He attended the University of Denver, the City College of New York and the Iowa Writers' Workshop Grumley received a B.S. Degree with a major in Philosophy from the University of Wisconsin-Milwaukee on June 7, 1964.

He was a founding member of The Violet Quill. His partner, another founding member of the Quill, was Robert Ferro. He wrote a regularly appearing column Uptown for the New York Native. Grumley and Ferro are buried together under the Ferro-Grumley memorial in Rockland Cemetery, Sparkill, New York.

Following their deaths, the Ferro-Grumley Foundation, which manages their estate, created and endowed the annual Ferro-Grumley Award for LGBT fiction in conjunction with Publishing Triangle.

Cryptozoology

Grumley was interested in cryptozoology, he was the author of a book on Bigfoot, titled There are Giants in the Earth the book was first published in 1975 with a later edition appearing in 1976. In the book Grumley concluded that anthropoid giants once roamed the earth, and that today there are still isolated survivors which he claimed are living in tunnels and caves.

Works and publications

References

External links 

 Michael Grumley Papers. Yale Collection of American Literature, Beinecke Rare Book and Manuscript Library.

1942 births
1988 deaths
People from Bettendorf, Iowa
20th-century American novelists
American male novelists
American gay writers
University of Denver alumni
Cryptozoologists
American LGBT novelists
LGBT people from Iowa
20th-century American male writers
20th-century American LGBT people